Kolatselga is a village within the Vedlozero rural settlement of Pryazhinsky District of the Republic of Karelia, Russia.

General information 

Located on the shores of Lake Tulmozero. Located at the intersection of the Kollasjoki River with the P21 motorway.

Historical monuments 

There are historical monuments in the village:

 The destroyed building of the Tulmozero iron smelter.

Population 

The population in 2013 was 99.

References

Notes

Sources

Urban-type settlements in the Republic of Karelia
Pryazhinsky District